HD 12661 c is a giant exoplanet one and a half times the mass of Jupiter orbiting around HD 12661.

References

Aries (constellation)
Exoplanets discovered in 2003
Giant planets
Exoplanets detected by radial velocity